Stamatis Spanoudakis - Σταμάτης Σπανουδάκης (born 11 December 1948 in Athens, Greece) is a modern Greek classical composer. Early on he studied classical guitar. He went through a rock music phase, but then continued classical studies at the Würzburg State Conservatory with Bertold Hummel and later in Athens with Konstantinos Kydoniatis. Later on he studied Byzantine music.

Biography

Stamatis Spanoudakis was born in Athens Greece, he is from an old aristocratic Greek family. Very early on he began to occupy himself with music.

He first studied Classical music ( guitar and theory ). He later played bass guitar and keyboards in a number of bands, in the sixties and the seventies, in Athens, Paris and London where he lived and recorded his first albums.

He later returned to Classical music and resumed his studies of composition, first in Wurzburg Germany with professor Bertold Hummel and then in Athens with professor Konstantinos Kydoniatis.

He was then attracted to his third love - Byzantine music, which led him to Greek songwriting and instrumental music.

Since then he is consciously trying to reconcile his three musical influences (Rock, classical and Byzantine), in his music.

He wrote numerous hit songs (words and music) for most major Greek singers.

He also wrote the music for many successful films in Greece, Germany and Italy, for the theater and television and has recorded so far more than sixty albums.

Since 1995, he concentrates on instrumental music, based on Greek historical or religious themes, a music that has an unprecedent appeal in Greece.

Stamatis lives in a quiet suburb with his wife Dori and their four dogs. He has his own studio where he records his music, being the composer, arranger, producer, performer and engineer of his work.

An introduction

He has worked with the most successful Greek singers, composing the music and writing the lyrics for a large number of hit songs. (I akti, Pame gi’alles polities, Lathos epohi, Simera, Efiges noris, Zoi klemmeni, Kalimera ti kanis, etc).
With his religious works, he has provided a very different perspective of contemporary byzantine music. (Kyrie ton Dynameon, Efta Paraklisis, Imera Triti, Earini Ora, etc).
He has made numerous soundtracks (Colours of Iris, Angel, Sudden Love, Stone Years, All in a road, Brides etc).
From 1994 he composes instrumental music exclusively. A music that embraces Greece's history and religion (Alexandros, John’s Tear, Marble King, For Smyrni, A Piece of My Soul, Moments Gone, Alexandros II, Rejoice my sea etc).

Discography

External links
Biography
Biography in Greek
Official Website
of publications in Discogs

References

1948 births
Greek songwriters
Greek classical musicians
Greek film score composers
Male film score composers
Living people
Musicians from Athens